Eodorcadion brandti is a species of beetle in the family Cerambycidae. It was described by Gebler in 1841.

References

Dorcadiini
Beetles described in 1841